The Kerala cricket team is a domestic cricket team based in the Indian state of Kerala. It is in the Elite Group of the Ranji Trophy, the premier first class cricket tournament in India. It was known as Travancore-Cochin cricket team until 1957/58.

Kerala has produced two Indian Test cricketers, Tinu Yohannan and S. Sreesanth. Sanju Samson has represented India in T20Is and ODIs, while Basil Thampi has a national call-up to his name. The team also lined up ex-Indian International player Sadagoppan Ramesh for two years from 2005 to 2007. Robin Uthappa, a former Indian International player currently plays for Kerala. Kerala has also produced Krishna Chandran, who plays at International level for United Arab Emirates.

Playing history

Kerala began competing in the 1957–58 Ranji Trophy, succeeding the Travancore-Cochin cricket team after the states were reorganized. It competed in the South Zone, against Madras/Tamil Nadu, Mysore/Karnataka, Andhra and Hyderabad. In 1957-58 Kerala lost all four matches, three of them by an innings.

In the 1959–60 season, Kerala's Balan Pandit (262*) and George Abraham (198) put up a 410 runs partnership in the fourth wicket, which is the highest in Indian first-class cricket. Pandit's score remained the highest for Kerala in FC format until the 2007–08 season.

At the end of the 2016–17 season, Kerala had played 302 first-class matches, and won 46, lost 140 and drawn 116. In List A cricket Kerala had played 120 matches, with 47 wins, 71 losses and two ties.

Kerala reached the pre-quarterfinal of Ranji Trophy in the 1994–95 season when they progressed as South zone winners under the captaincy of KN Ananthapadmanabhan. They were qualified for the Super League after emerging as the south zone winners in 1996-97 under leadership of Feroze V Rasheed. Kerala reached plate final in 2002-03 and semifinal in 2007–08.

In November 2017, they progressed to the quarter-finals of the Ranji Trophy for the first time, when they finished second in Group B of the 2017–18 tournament.

They put on their best show in Ranji Trophy history when they progressed to the semifinals in 2018–19 season after beating former champions Gujarat in quarters.

Governing body

The Kerala Cricket Association (KCA) is the governing body for the Kerala cricket team. It was founded on 1951 and is affiliated to the Board of Control for Cricket in India (BCCI) and the Kerala State Sports Authority (KSSA). It is the parent body of the 14 district associations in Kerala.

Current squad 
Players with International caps are listed in bold.

Updated as on 24 January 2023

Support Staff

Stadiums

International stadiums

Active Stadium

Former Stadiums

Other stadiums

Famous players

Players from Kerala who have played Test cricket for India, along with year of Test debut:

Tinu Yohannan (2001)
Shanthakumaran Sreesanth (2006)

Players from Kerala who have played ODI but not Test cricket for India, along with year of ODI debut:

Sanju Samson (2021)

Cricketers who played a large portion of their career for Kerala, and played T20I for India, along with year of T20I debut :

Sandeep Warrier (2021)

Cricketers from other state teams who also played for Kerala, and played international cricket for India, along with year of international debut:

Sujith Somasunder (1996)
Sadagoppan Ramesh (1999)
Robin Uthappa (2006)

Prominent cricketers at the domestic level:
Ajay Varma
Ajay Kudua
Antony Sebastian
B. Ramprakash
Balan Pandit
Basil Thampi
Feroze V Rasheed
Kelappan Thampuran
K. N. Ananthapadmanabhan
K Jayaraman
Padmanabhan Prasanth
Prasanth Parameswaran
Krishna Chandran (Represented UAE)
Raiphi Gomez
Rohan Prem
Sachin Baby
Sony Cheruvathur
Sreekumar Nair
Sunil Oasis
Thomas Mathew
VA Jagadeesh

References

Bibliography

External links
 Kerala at CricketArchive
Official website

Indian first-class cricket teams
Cricket in Kerala
1957 establishments in Kerala
Cricket clubs established in 1957